Björneborgarnas marsch ('March of the Björneborgers' or 'March of the Pori Regiment') is a Swedish military march from the 18th century. Today, it is mainly performed in Finland and has served as the honorary march of the Finnish Defence Forces since 1918.

History
The original melody of Björneborgarnas marsch is most likely French in origin, and was composed by an unknown composer in the 18th century, although the modern brass band arrangement is by the Finnish German composer Konrad Greve. 

Later in the same century, it was made popular in Sweden by the poet Carl Michael Bellman, who used it as a basis for his epistle 51 “Movitz blåste en konsert” (Movitz blew a concert), and was subsequently adopted as a military march by the Royal Swedish army. Following Sweden’s defeat to Russia in the Finnish war of 1808-1809, her eastern lands formed the Russian-controlled Grand duchy of Finland.

The march remained popular throughout the 19th century in both Sweden and Finland. The original text was published in Swedish in 1860 by the Finnish national poet Johan Ludvig Runeberg in his epic poem The Tales of Ensign Stål, although Zachris Topelius had also given it his own words in 1858. The most commonly used Finnish translation was written by Paavo Cajander in 1889, along with Cajander's translation of The Tales of Ensign Stål. The name of the march refers to the Björneborg regiment (Pori in Finnish) of the Swedish army. It contains an iambic meter.

Use
Björneborgarnas marsch today serves as the honorary march of the Finnish Defence Forces and is played (only rarely sung) for the Commander-in-Chief, i.e. the President of Finland. The President has, however, the right to delegate this position to another Finnish citizen; the only time this has occurred was during the World War II, when Marshal Carl Gustaf Emil Mannerheim acted as Commander-in-Chief instead of then-President Risto Ryti. Thus, Ryti is the only President of Finland not to have been Commander-in-Chief at any point of his two terms (1940–1944).

As Finland and Estonia share similarities in their languages, culture and also through their respective military traditions, it is also the Estonian Defence Forces' official honorary march, played for the Commander of the Estonian Defence Forces, its Commander-in-Chief appointed, under constitutional provisions, to the office by the Ministry of Defence and the Cabinet on the proposal of the President of the Republic of Estonia. The tune was first publicly played in Estonia at the 7th Estonian Song Festival in 1910. It was also the march of the State Elder (later as presidential march) in Estonia till 27 January 1923 when the then-Minister of War Jaan Soots replaced it with the Pidulik marss which had won the contest for Estonian-composed state honorary march in 1922.

Non-political 
Since 1948, the Finnish national broadcast company Yleisradio has played Björneborgarnas marsch played on radio or television every time a Finnish athlete wins a gold medal in the Olympic games – the traditional phrase to initiate this was "Pasila, Porilaisten Marssi" (radio) and "Helsinki, Porilaisten Marssi" (television). An exception to this was made in 1998 when MTV3 similarly asked the song to be played after Mika Häkkinen won the 1998 Formula One World Championship.

Björneborgarnas marsch is also played on Christmas Eve during the Declaration of Christmas Peace ceremony, which has caused minor controversy due to the violent lyrics of the march, even though the lyrics are not sung on the occasion.

In the video game My Summer Car, the march is played on the intro. A remixed version can be heard in the credits scene.

Lyrics

Original Swedish lyrics
Johan Ludvig Runeberg, 1860

//

//

//

Lyrics in Finnish
Translation by Paavo Cajander, 1889.

Lyrics in Estonian

Lyrics in English
Modern translation.

Sons of a people whose blood was shed,
On the field of Narva; Polish sand; at Leipzig; on Lützen's dark hills;
Not yet is Finland defeated;
With the blood of foes a field may still be tinted red!
Rest, begone, away, and peace!
A storm unleashed; lightning swarms and cannons thunder on,
Forward! Forward, line by line!
Brave fathers look down on brave sons.

No nobler aim,
Could light our way,
Our steel is sharp,
To bleed is our custom,
Man by man, brave and bold!
Behold our ancient freedom's march!

Shine bright, our victorious banner!
Torn by distant battles of days gone,
Be proud, our noble, tattered Standard!
There is still a piece of Finland's ancient Colours left!

See also
 "Maamme", Finnish national anthem
 "Mu isamaa, mu õnn ja rõõm", Estonian national anthem

References

External links
 Porilaisten marssi in YouTube
 Recording of the song (WAV format) at the official website of the President of Finland

Swedish military marches
Finnish patriotic songs
National symbols of Finland
Finnish poems
Finnish military marches
Songs about Finland
Estonian patriotic songs
National symbols of Estonia
Estonian poems
Estonian military marches